Ready to Fly is the only studio album by German-American singer Melanie Thornton. It was released by X-Cell Records on May 7, 2001 in German-speaking Europe after Thornton's departure as the lead vocalist of the Eurodance electronic music duo La Bouche. Taking her solo work further into the soul pop and dance pop genres, Thornton worked with chief producers Mitchell Lennox and Julien Nairolf on the album, on which she co-wrote six tracks. Other collaborators include Todd Chisolm, Jay Tee Rogers, Martin Mayer, Rob Tyger, Raúl de Chile, and Bobby Stalker.

Upon its original release, Ready to Fly was a lukewarm commercial success, debuting at number 18 on the German Albums Chart. Following Thornton's death in the crash of Swiss airline's Crossair Flight 3597 in Bassersdorf on November 24, 2001, the album re-entered charts, eventually reaching the top five in Germany and Switzerland, where it was certified gold in 2002, pushed by a 2002 re-issue of Ready to Fly which included her posthumously released hit single "Wonderful Dream (Holidays Are Coming)", a Coca-Cola Christmas promotional song.

Critical reception
Ready to Fly received generally positive reviews from music critics. Laut.de rated the album four out of five stars and wrote: "Truly tragic that such a promising solo career was brought to an abrupt end. Ready to Fly could have become a cult pop album in no time at all. At least it has what it takes." Allmusic gave the album two and a half stars out of five.

Track listing
All tracks are produced by Mitchell Lennox and Julien Nairolf; except "Back On My Feet Again," co-produced by Rob Tyger.

Charts

Weekly charts

Year-end charts

Certifications

Release history

References

2001 debut albums